The 2009–10 Tulsa Golden Hurricane men's basketball team represented the University of Tulsa in the 2009–10 college basketball season. This was head coach Doug Wojcik's fifth season at Tulsa. The Golden Hurricane competed in Conference USA and played their home games at the Reynolds Center. They finished the season 23–12, 10–6 in CUSA play, lost in the semifinals of the 2010 Conference USA men's basketball tournament and were invited to the 2010 National Invitation Tournament where they lost in the first round.

Roster
Source

Schedule and results
Source
All times are Central

|-
!colspan=9| Regular Season

|-
!colspan=9| 2010 Conference USA men's basketball tournament

|-
!colspan=9| 2010 National Invitation Tournament

References

Tulsa
Tulsa
Tulsa Golden Hurricane men's basketball seasons
Tulsa Golden Hurricane men's b
Tulsa Golden Hurricane men's b